Scott Hilton (born May 28, 1954) is a former American football linebacker who played two seasons with the San Francisco 49ers of the National Football League. He attended Upper Moreland High School in Willow Grove, Pennsylvania. Hilton was heavily recruited out of high school but chose to go to work as a carpenter instead. He also later enrolled at Salem College on a football scholarship in January 1973 but left the school before playing for the team. He played for the semi-pro Somerton All Stars, in Northeast Philadelphia. He attended training camp with the Philadelphia Eagles in 1977 and 1978. He was signed by the 49ers in 1979.

References

External links
Just Sports Stats

Living people
1954 births
American football linebackers
Salem Tigers football players
Philadelphia Eagles players
San Francisco 49ers players
Players of American football from Harrisburg, Pennsylvania